The Miami Kickers were an American women's soccer team based in the Miami metropolitan area. Founded in 2005, the team played in the Women's Premier Soccer League (WPSL) from 2006 to 2010. They played their home games in the stadium on the campus of American Heritage School in Plantation, Florida, 26 miles north of downtown Miami.

The team was founded in 2005, and in 2006 joined the WPSL, on the second tier of women's soccer in the United States and Canada. They were previously known Fort Lauderdale Fusion. They spent five seasons in the WPSL, but are not on the league's lists for 2011. The club's colors were white and royal blue.

Players

Current roster

Notable former players

Year-by-year

Honors

Competition history

Coaches
  Marc Miceli -present

Stadia
 Stadium at American Heritage School, Plantation, Florida -present

Average attendance

References

External links
 Official Site
 WPSL Miami Kickers page

Women's Premier Soccer League teams
Women's soccer clubs in the United States
Kickers
Plantation, Florida
2005 establishments in Florida
2010 disestablishments in Florida
Women's sports in Florida